Irugur is a suburb of Coimbatore city in the state of Tamil Nadu. It is one of the fastest developing suburbs in the Coimbatore Metropolitan Area.  It is located to the north of Trichy Road which is a part of  National Highway National Highway 81.

Geography
It has an average elevation of 343 metres (1125 feet).

The name Irugur refers to Iru+Oor, i.e. Iru="two" and "Oor"=place in Tamil. Earlier these were two places separated by the river Noyyal.

Irugur is surrounded by the urban areas of the Coimbatore city limits such as
Ondipudur, SIHS Colony on the west, Chinniyampalayam on the north and the suburban areas such as Pallapalayam and Ottarpalayam on the east, Pattanam on the south. The Coimbatore International Airport is located to the north of Irugur.

Demographics 
The total population in Irugur is 25,691 as per the survey of census during 2011 by Indian Government. There are 7,459 House Holds in Irugur. There are 12,909 males (50%) and 12,782 females(50%).The literacy rate is 78%.

Transport 
There is an Irugur Junction where most of Kerala trains are bypassed to Podanur Junction without entering into Coimbatore city. Major Passengers trains and Jan Shatabdi express train have a stoppage at this railway station. Now at the current scenario, it has a great potential to become Coimbatore East Junction due to its proximity to certain major eastern suburbs of the Coimbatore City such as Pallapalayam, Sulur, Karumathampatti, Karanampettai, Chinniyampalayam, etc.

Main sights
 

Nilakandaeshwarar Temple

References

Suburbs of Coimbatore
Cities and towns in Coimbatore district